Peter James Bercich (born December 23, 1971) is a former professional American football linebacker in the National Football League. He played college football for the University of Notre Dame. He played five seasons for the NFL's Minnesota Vikings (1995–2000).  After his playing days were over he spent 5 years as a Vikings' defensive assistant.  He has served as the color commentator on the Vikings Radio Network since 2007. To date, his career highlight in radio broadcasting (by his own admission) was subbing for Dan "The Common Man" Cole on KFAN-AM 1130 in Minneapolis – Saint Paul on October 14, 2008. In May 2016, Bercich was hired as the head football coach at Hill-Murray School.

References

External links
 KFAN Vikings Broadcast Team

1971 births
Living people
American football linebackers
Minnesota Vikings announcers
Minnesota Vikings coaches
Minnesota Vikings players
National Football League announcers
Notre Dame Fighting Irish football players
Sportspeople from Joliet, Illinois
Players of American football from Illinois
American people of Slavic descent